Kinross Charter Township is a charter township of Chippewa County in the U.S. state of Michigan. The population was 7,561 at the 2010 census, up from 5,922 at the 2000 census.

Communities
 Kincheloe, located in the eastern part of the township just east of Interstate 75, is on part of the former Kincheloe Air Force Base, which was deactivated in 1977. It has a US Post Office (49788).
 Kinross is the unincorporated area in the eastern end of Kinross Charter Township outside of Kincheloe. Its US Post Office (49752) is located adjacent to Interstate 75, west-northwest of Kincheloe.

Geography

Demographics
As of the 2000 United States Census, there were 5,922 people, 1,156 households, and 887 families in the township. There were 1,519 housing units at an average density of 12.7 per square mile (4.9/km2). The racial makeup of the township was 64.59% White, 17.24% African American, 11.30% Native American, 0.61% Asian, 0.83% from other races, and 5.44% from two or more races. Hispanic or Latino of any race were 2.68% of the population.

There were 1,156 households, out of which 48.8% had children under the age of 18 living with them, 53.9% were married couples living together, 17.5% had a female householder with no husband present, and 23.2% were non-families. 17.9% of all households were made up of individuals, and 4.1% had someone living alone who was 65 years of age or older. The average household size was 2.94 and the average family size was 3.30.

The township population contained 20.6% under the age of 18, 9.7% from 18 to 24, 46.7% from 25 to 44, 19.4% from 45 to 64, and 3.6% who were 65 years of age or older. The median age was 34 years. For every 100 females, there were 242.1 males. For every 100 females age 18 and over, there were 311.6 males.

The median income for a household in the township was $36,525, and the median income for a family was $38,468. Males had a median income of $27,250 versus $23,980 for females. The per capita income for the township was $14,003. About 13.6% of families and 16.4% of the population were below the poverty line, including 23.1% of those under age 18 and 3.4% of those age 65 or over.

Transportation
 Chippewa County International Airport, on a portion of the previous Kincheloe Air Force Base, provides regional airline service to the area.
 Indian Trails provides daily intercity bus service between St. Ignace and Ironwood, Michigan.

Historic sites
The old Kinross Township Hall and School, located in Kinross, is listed on the National Register of Historic Places.

References

External links
Kinross Charter Township official website
Kinross Business Association

Townships in Chippewa County, Michigan
Charter townships in Michigan